Gopalpeta is a Mandal in Wanaparthy district, Telangana, India.

Institutions
 Zilla Parishad High School
 Government Junior College

Villages
The villages in Gopalpeta mandal include:
Bandaraipakula
Buddaram
Chakalapally
Cheerkapally
Chennur
Gopalpet
Jainthirmalapur
Keshampet
Munnanoor
Nagapur
Polkepad
Revally
Tadiparthy	
Talpunur
Yedula
Yedutla

References

Mandals in Wanaparthy district